Saint Vincent and the Grenadines competed at the 2015 Pan American Games in Toronto, Canada from July 10 to 26, 2015.

A team of five athletes (three men and two women) across three sports (athletics, swimming and for the first time taekwondo) represented the country at the games. This marked an increase of one athlete from the previous edition of the games in 2011. 

Before competition began, The Saint Vincent and Grenadines delegation had a pre-games training camp at Georgian College in Barrie, just north of Toronto.

Track and field athlete Kineke Alexander was the flagbearer for the team during the opening ceremony. 
Alexander also won the country's only medal at the games, a bronze, in the women's 400 metres event. This ranked the country an equal 28th on the medal table.

Competitors
The following table lists the Saint Vincent and the Grenadines delegation per sport and gender.

Medalists

The following competitors from Saint Vincent and the Grenadines won medals at the games. In the by discipline sections below, medalists' names are bolded.

| style="text-align:left; width:78%; vertical-align:top;"|

| style="text-align:left; width:22%; vertical-align:top;"|

Athletics

The Saint Vincent and the Grenadines qualified two athletes.

Track

Swimming

The Saint Vincent and the Grenadines received two universality spots (one male and one female).

Taekwondo

The Saint Vincent and the Grenadines received a wildcard to enter one male athlete.

See also
Saint Vincent and the Grenadines at the 2016 Summer Olympics

References

Nations at the 2015 Pan American Games
P
2015